

Events

Pre-1600
763 BC – Assyrians record a solar eclipse that is later used to fix the chronology of Mesopotamian history.
 844 – Louis II is crowned as king of Italy at Rome by pope Sergius II.
 923 – Battle of Soissons: King Robert I of France is killed and King Charles the Simple is arrested by the supporters of Duke Rudolph of Burgundy.
1184 – The naval Battle of Fimreite is won by the Birkebeiner pretender Sverre Sigurdsson. Sigurdsson takes the Norwegian throne and King Magnus V of Norway is killed. 
1215 – King John of England puts his seal to Magna Carta.
1219 – Northern Crusades: Danish victory at the Battle of Lindanise (modern-day Tallinn) establishes the Danish Duchy of Estonia. 
1246 – With the death of Frederick II, Duke of Austria, the Babenberg dynasty ends in Austria.
1300 – The city of Bilbao is founded.
1312 – At the Battle of Rozgony, King Charles I of Hungary wins a decisive victory over the family of Palatine Amade Aba.
1389 – Battle of Kosovo: The Ottoman Empire defeats Serbs and Bosnians.
1410 – In a decisive battle at Onon River, the Mongol forces of Oljei Temur were decimated by the Chinese armies of the Yongle Emperor.
  1410   – Ottoman Interregnum: Süleyman Çelebi defeats his brother Musa Çelebi outside the Byzantine capital, Constantinople.
1502 – Christopher Columbus lands on the island of Martinique on his fourth voyage.
1520 – Pope Leo X threatens to excommunicate Martin Luther in Exsurge Domine.

1601–1900
1607 – Colonists finished building James's Fort, to defend against Spanish and Indian attacks. 
1648 – Margaret Jones is hanged in Boston for witchcraft in the first such execution for the Massachusetts Bay Colony.
1667 – The first human blood transfusion is administered by Dr. Jean-Baptiste Denys.
1670 – The first stone of Fort Ricasoli is laid down in Malta.
1752 – Benjamin Franklin proves that lightning is electricity (traditional date, the exact date is unknown).
1776 – Delaware Separation Day: Delaware votes to suspend government under the British Crown and separate officially from Pennsylvania.
1800 – The Provisional Army of the United States is dissolved. 
1804 – New Hampshire approves the Twelfth Amendment to the United States Constitution, ratifying the document.
1808 – Joseph Bonaparte becomes King of Spain.
1836 – Arkansas is admitted as the 25th U.S. state.
1844 – Charles Goodyear receives a patent for vulcanization, a process to strengthen rubber.
1846 – The Oregon Treaty extends the border between the United States and British North America, established by the Treaty of 1818, westward to the Pacific Ocean.
1859 – Ambiguity in the Oregon Treaty leads to the "Northwestern Boundary Dispute" between American and British/Canadian settlers.
1864 – American Civil War: The Second Battle of Petersburg begins.
  1864   – Arlington National Cemetery is established when  of the Arlington estate (formerly owned by Confederate General Robert E. Lee) are officially set aside as a military cemetery by U.S. Secretary of War Edwin M. Stanton.
1877 – Henry Ossian Flipper becomes the first African American cadet to graduate from the United States Military Academy.
1878 – Eadweard Muybridge takes a series of photographs to prove that all four feet of a horse leave the ground when it runs; the study becomes the basis of motion pictures.
1888 – Crown Prince Wilhelm becomes Kaiser Wilhelm II; he will be the last Emperor of the German Empire. Due to the death of his predecessors Wilhelm I and Frederick III, 1888 is the Year of the Three Emperors.
1896 – One of the deadliest tsunamis in Japan's history kills more than 22,000 people.

1901–present
1904 – A fire aboard the steamboat  in New York City's East River kills 1,000.
1916 – United States President Woodrow Wilson signs a bill incorporating the Boy Scouts of America, making them the only American youth organization with a federal charter.
1919 – John Alcock and Arthur Brown complete the first nonstop transatlantic flight when they reach Clifden, County Galway, Ireland.
1920 – Following the 1920 Schleswig plebiscites, Northern Schleswig is transferred from Germany to Denmark.
1921 – Bessie Coleman earns her pilot's license, becoming the first female pilot of African-American descent.
1934 – The United States Great Smoky Mountains National Park is founded.
1936 – First flight of the Vickers Wellington bomber.
1937 – A German expedition led by Karl Wien loses sixteen members in an avalanche on Nanga Parbat. It is the worst single disaster to occur on an 8000m peak.
1940 – World War II: Operation Aerial begins: Allied troops start to evacuate France, following Germany's takeover of Paris and most of the nation.
1944 – World War II: The United States invades Saipan, capital of Japan's South Seas Mandate.
  1944   – In the Saskatchewan general election, the CCF, led by Tommy Douglas, is elected and forms the first socialist government in North America.
1970 – Charles Manson goes on trial for the Sharon Tate murders.
1972 – Red Army Faction co-founder Ulrike Meinhof is captured by police in Langenhagen.
  1972   – Cathay Pacific Flight 700Z is destroyed by a bomb over Pleiku, Vietnam (then South Vietnam) kills 81 people.
1977 – After the death of dictator Francisco Franco in 1975, the first democratic elections took place in Spain.
1978 – King Hussein of Jordan marries American Lisa Halaby, who takes the name Queen Noor.
1985 – Rembrandt's painting Danaë is attacked by a man (later judged insane) who throws sulfuric acid on the canvas and cuts it twice with a knife.
1991 – In the Philippines, Mount Pinatubo erupts in the second largest volcanic eruption of the 20th century, killing over 800 people.
1992 – The United States Supreme Court rules in United States v. Álvarez-Machaín that it is permissible for the United States to forcibly extradite suspects in foreign countries and bring them to the United States for trial, without approval from those other countries.
1996 – The Troubles: The Provisional Irish Republican Army (IRA) detonates a powerful truck bomb in the middle of Manchester, England, devastating the city centre and injuring 200 people.
2001 – Leaders of China, Russia, Kazakhstan, Kyrgyzstan, Tajikistan and Uzbekistan formed the Shanghai Cooperation Organisation.
2007 – The Nokkakivi Amusement Park is opened in Lievestuore, Laukaa, Finland.
2012 – Nik Wallenda becomes the first person to successfully tightrope walk directly over Niagara Falls.
2013 – A bomb explodes on a bus in the Pakistani city of Quetta, killing at least 25 people and wounding 22 others.
2022 – Microsoft retires its ubiquitous Internet Explorer after 26 years in favor of its new browser, Microsoft Edge.

Births

Pre-1600
1330 – Edward, the Black Prince of England (d. 1376)
1479 – Lisa del Giocondo, Italian model, subject of the Mona Lisa (d. 1542)
1519 – Henry FitzRoy, 1st Duke of Richmond and Somerset, English politician, Lord Lieutenant of Ireland (d. 1536)
1542 – Richard Grenville, English captain and explorer (d. 1591)
1549 – Elizabeth Knollys, English noblewoman (d. 1605)
1553 – Archduke Ernest of Austria (d. 1595)

1601–1900
1605 – Thomas Randolph, English poet and playwright (d. 1635)
1623 – Cornelis de Witt, Dutch politician (d. 1672)
1624 – Hiob Ludolf, German orientalist and philologist (d. 1704)
1640 – Bernard Lamy, French mathematician and theologian (d. 1715)
1645 – Sidney Godolphin, 1st Earl of Godolphin, English politician (d. 1712)
1749 – Georg Joseph Vogler, German organist, composer, and theorist (d. 1814)
1754 – Juan José Elhuyar, Spanish chemist and mineralogist (d. 1796)
1755 – Antoine François, comte de Fourcroy, French chemist and entomologist (d. 1809)
1763 – Franz Danzi, German cellist, composer, and conductor (d. 1826)
  1763   – Kobayashi Issa, Japanese priest and poet (d. 1827)
1765 – Henry Thomas Colebrooke, English orientalist (d. 1837)
1767 – Rachel Jackson, American wife of Andrew Jackson (d. 1828)
1777 – David Daniel Davis, Welsh physician and academic (d. 1841)
1789 – Josiah Henson, American minister, author, and activist (d. 1883)
1790 – Charles-Amédée Kohler, Swiss chocolatier (d. 1874)
1792 – Thomas Mitchell, Scottish-Australian colonel and explorer (d. 1855)
1801 – Benjamin Wright Raymond, American merchant and politician, 3rd Mayor of Chicago (d. 1883)
1805 – William B. Ogden, American businessman and politician, 1st Mayor of Chicago (d. 1877)
1809 – François-Xavier Garneau, Canadian poet and historian (d. 1866)
1835 – Adah Isaacs Menken, American actress, painter, and poet (d. 1868)
1843 – Edvard Grieg, Norwegian pianist and composer (d. 1907)
1848 – Gheevarghese Mar Gregorios of Parumala, Indian bishop and saint (d. 1902)
1872 – Thomas William Burgess, English swimmer and water polo player (d. 1950)
1875 – Herman Smith-Johannsen, Norwegian-Canadian skier (d. 1987)
1878 – Margaret Abbott, Indian-American golfer (d. 1955)
1881 – Kesago Nakajima, Japanese lieutenant general in the Imperial Japanese Army (d. 1945)
1884 – Harry Langdon, American actor, director, and screenwriter (d. 1944)
1886 – Frank Clement, British racing driver (d. 1970)
1888 – Ramón López Velarde, Mexican poet and author (d. 1921)
1890 – Georg Wüst, German oceanographer and academic (d. 1977)
1894 – Robert Russell Bennett, American composer and conductor (d. 1981)
  1894   – Nikolai Chebotaryov, Ukrainian-Russian mathematician and theorist (d. 1947)
1898 – Hubertus Strughold, German-American physiologist and academic (d. 1986)
1900 – Gotthard Günther, German philosopher and academic (d. 1984)
  1900   – Otto Luening, German-American composer and conductor (d. 1996)

1901–present
1901 – Elmar Lohk, Russian-Estonian architect (d. 1963)
1902 – Erik Erikson, German-American psychologist and psychoanalyst (d. 1994)
1906 – Gordon Welchman, English-American mathematician and author (d. 1985)
  1906   – Léon Degrelle, Belgian SS officer (d. 1994)
1907 – James Robertson Justice, English actor and educator (d. 1975)
1909 – Elena Nikolaidi, Greek-American soprano and educator (d. 2002)
1910 – David Rose, English-American pianist, composer, and conductor (d. 1990)
1911 – Wilbert Awdry, English author, created The Railway Series, the basis for Thomas The Tank Engine (d. 1997)
1913 – Tom Adair, American songwriter, composer, and screenwriter (d. 1988)
1914 – Yuri Andropov, Russian politician (d. 1984)
  1914   – Saul Steinberg, Romanian-American cartoonist (d. 1999)
  1914   – Hilda Terry, American cartoonist (d. 2006)
1915 – Nini Theilade, Danish ballet dancer, choreographer, and educator (d. 2018)
  1915   – Thomas Huckle Weller, American biologist and virologist, Nobel Prize laureate (d. 2008)
1916 – Olga Erteszek, Polish-American fashion designer (d. 1989)
  1916   – Horacio Salgán, Argentinian pianist, composer, and conductor (d. 2016)
  1916   – Herbert A. Simon, American political scientist and economist, Nobel Prize laureate (d. 2001)
1917 – John Fenn, American chemist and academic, Nobel Prize laureate (d. 2010)
  1917   – Michalis Genitsaris, Greek singer-songwriter (d. 2005)
  1917   – Lash LaRue, American actor and producer (d. 1996)
1918 – François Tombalbaye, Chadian politician, 1st President of Chad (d. 1975)
1920 – Keith Andrews, American race car driver (d. 1957)
  1920   – Alla Kazanskaya, Russian actress (d. 2008)
  1920   – Sam Sniderman, Canadian businessman, founded Sam the Record Man (d. 2012)
  1920   – Alberto Sordi, Italian actor, director, and screenwriter (d. 2003)
1921 – Erroll Garner, American pianist and composer (d. 1977)
1922 – Jaki Byard, American pianist and composer (d. 1999)
1923 – Erland Josephson, Swedish actor and director (d. 2012)
  1923   – Ninian Stephen, English-Australian lieutenant, judge, and politician, 20th Governor-General of Australia (d. 2017)
1924 – Hédi Fried, Swedish author and psychologist (d. 2022)
  1924   – Ezer Weizman, Israeli general and politician, 7th President of Israel (d. 2005)
1925 – Richard Baker, English journalist and author (d. 2018)
  1925   – Attilâ İlhan, Turkish poet, author, and critic (d. 2005)
1926 – Alfred Duraiappah, Sri Lankan Tamil lawyer and politician (d. 1975)
1927 – Ross Andru, American illustrator (d. 1993)
  1927   – Ibn-e-Insha, Indian-Pakistani poet and author (d. 1978)
  1927   – Hugo Pratt, Italian author and illustrator (d. 1995)
1930 – Miguel Méndez, American author and academic (d. 2013)
  1930   – Marcel Pronovost, Canadian ice hockey player and coach (d. 2015)
1931 – Joseph Gilbert, English air marshal
1932 – David Alliance, Baron Alliance, Iranian-English businessman and politician
  1932   – Mario Cuomo, American lawyer and politician, 52nd Governor of New York (d. 2015)
  1932   – Zia Fariduddin Dagar, Indian singer (d. 2013)
  1932   – Bernie Faloney, American-Canadian football player and sportscaster (d. 1999)
1933 – Mohammad-Ali Rajai, Iranian politician, 2nd President of Iran (d. 1981)
  1933   – Predrag Koraksić Corax, Serbian political caricaturist
1934 – Ruby Nash Garnett, American R&B singer
1936 – William Levada, American cardinal (d. 2019)
1937 – Pierre Billon, Swiss-Canadian author and screenwriter
  1937   – Waylon Jennings, American singer-songwriter and guitarist (d. 2002)
1938 – Billy Williams, American baseball player and coach
1939 – Ward Connerly, American activist and businessman, founded the American Civil Rights Institute
1941 – Neal Adams, American illustrator (d. 2022)
  1941   – Harry Nilsson, American singer-songwriter (d. 1994)
1942 – Ian Greenberg, Canadian broadcaster, founded Astral Media
  1942   – John E. McLaughlin, American diplomat
  1942   – Peter Norman, Australian sprinter (d. 2006)
1943 – Johnny Hallyday, French singer and actor (d. 2017)
  1943   – Poul Nyrup Rasmussen, Danish politician, 38th Prime Minister of Denmark
1944 – Robert D. Keppel, American police officer and academic (d. 2021)
1945 – Miriam Defensor Santiago, Filipino judge and politician (d. 2016)
  1945   – Robert Sarah, Guinean cardinal
  1945   – Lawrence Wilkerson, American colonel 
1946 – Noddy Holder, English rock singer-songwriter, musician, and actor
  1946   – John Horner, American paleontologist and academic
  1946   – Demis Roussos, Egyptian-Greek singer-songwriter and bass player (d. 2015)
1947 – John Hoagland, American photographer and journalist (d. 1984)
1948 – Mike Holmgren, American football player and coach
  1948   – Alan Huckle, English politician and diplomat, Governor of Anguilla
  1948   – Henry McLeish, Scottish footballer, academic, and politician, 2nd First Minister of Scotland
1949 – Dusty Baker, American baseball player and manager
  1949   – Simon Callow, English actor and director
  1949   – Russell Hitchcock, Australian singer-songwriter
  1949   – Jim Varney, American actor, comedian, and screenwriter (d. 2000)
1950 – Uğur Erdener, Turkish ophthalmologist and professor
  1950   – Juliana Azumah-Mensah, Ghanaian nurse and politician
  1950   – Deney Terrio, American choreographer and television host
  1950   – Lakshmi Mittal, Indian-English businessman
1951 – Jane Amsterdam, American magazine and newspaper editor (Manhattan, inc., New York Post)
  1951   – Vance A. Larson, American painter (d. 2000)
  1951   – John Redwood, English politician, Secretary of State for Wales
  1951   – Steve Walsh, American rock singer-songwriter and musician
1952 – Satya Pal Jain, Indian lawyer and politician, Additional Solicitor General of India
1953 – Vilma Bardauskienė, Lithuanian long jumper
  1953   – Marc Brickman, American lighting and production designer
  1953   – Eje Elgh, Swedish racing driver and sportscaster
  1953   – Xi Jinping, Chinese engineer and politician, General Secretary of the Communist Party and President of China
  1953   – Raphael Wallfisch, English cellist and educator
1954 – Jim Belushi, American actor
  1954   – Terri Gibbs, American country music singer and keyboard player
  1954   – Paul Rusesabagina, Rwandan humanitarian
  1954   – Zdeňka Šilhavá, Czech discus thrower and shot putter
  1954   – Beverley Whitfield, Australian swimmer (d. 1996)
1955 – Polly Draper, American actress, producer, and screenwriter
  1955   – Julie Hagerty, American model and actress
1956 – Yevgeny Kiselyov, Russian-Ukrainian journalist
  1956   – Lance Parrish, American baseball player, coach, and manager
1957 – Brett Butler, American baseball player and coach
1958 – Wade Boggs, American baseball player
  1958   – Riccardo Paletti, Italian racing driver (d. 1982)
1959 – Alan Brazil, Scottish footballer and sportscaster
  1959   – Eileen Davidson, American model and actress
1960 – Michèle Laroque, French actress, producer, and screenwriter
  1960   – Marieke van Doorn, Dutch field hockey player and coach
1961 – Dave McAuley, Northern Irish boxer and sportscaster
  1961   – Scott Norton, American wrestler
1962 – Brad Armstrong, American wrestler (d. 2012)
  1962   – Chris Morris, English actor, satirist, director, and producer
  1962   – Andrea Rost, Hungarian soprano
1963 – Mario Gosselin, Canadian ice hockey player and sportscaster
  1963   – Helen Hunt, American actress, director, and producer
  1963   – Lourdes Valera, Venezuelan actress (d. 2012)
1964 – Courteney Cox, American actress and producer
  1964   – Michael Laudrup, Danish footballer and manager
1965 – Annelies Bredael, Belgian rower
  1965   – Karim Massimov, Kazakhstani politician, 7th Prime Minister of Kazakhstan
  1965   – Adam Smith, American lawyer and politician
1966 – Raimonds Vējonis, Latvian politician, 9th President of Latvia 
1968 – Károly Güttler, Hungarian swimmer
1969 – Jesse Bélanger, Canadian ice hockey player
  1969   – Ice Cube, American rapper, producer, and actor 
  1969   – Idalis DeLeón, American singer and actress 
  1969   – Nasos Galakteros, Greek basketball player
  1969   – Oliver Kahn, German footballer and sportscaster
  1969   – Maurice Odumbe, Kenyan cricketer
  1969   – Cédric Pioline, French tennis player
1970 – Christian Bauman, American soldier and author
  1970   – David Bayssari, Australian rugby league player 
  1970   – Gaëlle Méchaly, French soprano
  1970   – Leah Remini, American actress and producer
  1970   – Žan Tabak, Croatian basketball player and coach
1971 – Christos Myriounis, Greek basketball player
  1971   – Jake Busey, American actor, musician, and film producer
1972 – Justin Leonard, American golfer
  1972   – Andy Pettitte, American baseball player
1973 – Tore Andre Flo, Norwegian footballer and coach
  1973   – Neil Patrick Harris, American actor and singer
  1973   – Pia Miranda, Australian actress
  1973   – Greg Vaughan, American actor and model
1976 – Jiří Ryba, Czech decathlete
1977 – Michael Doleac, American basketball player and manager
1978 – Wilfred Bouma, Dutch footballer
  1978   – Zach Day, American baseball player
1979 – Yulia Nestsiarenka, Belarusian sprinter
  1979   – Christian Rahn, German footballer
  1979   – Charles Zwolsman Jr., Dutch racing driver
1980 – David Lyons, Australian rugby player 
1981 – John Paintsil, Ghanaian footballer
1982 – Mike Delany, New Zealand rugby player
  1982   – Abdur Razzak, Bangladeshi cricketer
1983 – Laura Imbruglia, Australian singer-songwriter and guitarist 
  1983   – Josh McGuire, Canadian fencer
1984 – Luke Hodge, Australian footballer
  1984   – Eva Hrdinová, Czech tennis player
  1984   – Tim Lincecum, American baseball player
  1984   – Edison Toloza, Colombian footballer
1985 – Ashley Nicole Black, American comedian, actress, and writer
1986 – James Maloney, Australian rugby league player
  1986   – Trevor Plouffe, American baseball player
1989 – Víctor Cabedo, Spanish cyclist (d. 2012)
  1989   – Bryan Clauson, American race car driver (d. 2016)
1992 – Michał Kopczyński, Polish footballer
  1992   – Mohamed Salah, Egyptian footballer
  1992   – Dafne Schippers, Dutch heptathlete and sprinter
1993 – Cooper Kupp, American football player
  1993   – Irfan Hadžić, Bosnian footballer
1994 – Inaki Williams, Basque footballer
1996 – Tia-Adana Belle, Barbadian athlete
1996 – Aurora Aksnes, Norwegian Electropop/Folk Singer
1997 – Madison Kocian, American gymnast

Deaths

Pre-1600
 923 – Robert I of France (b. 866)
 948 – Romanos I Lekapenos, Byzantine Emperor (b. c. 870)
 952 – Murong Yanchao, Chinese general
 960 – Eadburh of Winchester, English princess and saint
 970 – Adalbert, bishop of Passau
 991 – Theophanu, Byzantine wife of Otto II, Holy Roman Emperor (b. 960)
1073 – Emperor Go-Sanjō of Japan (b. 1034)
1184 – Magnus Erlingsson, King of Norway (b. 1156)
1189 – Minamoto no Yoshitsune, Japanese general (b. 1159)
1246 – Frederick II, Duke of Austria (b. 1219)
1337 – Angelo da Clareno, Italian Franciscan and leader of a group of Fraticelli (b. 1247)
1341 – Andronikos III Palaiologos, Byzantine emperor (b. 1297)
1381 – John Cavendish, English lawyer and judge (b. 1346)
  1381   – Wat Tyler, English rebel leader (b. 1341)
1383 – John VI Kantakouzenos, Byzantine emperor (b. 1292)
  1383   – Matthew Kantakouzenos, Byzantine emperor
1389 – Lazar of Serbia (b. 1329)
  1389   – Murad I, Ottoman Sultan (b. 1319)
  1389   – Miloš Obilić, Serbian knight.
1416 – John, Duke of Berry (b. 1340)
1467 – Philip III, Duke of Burgundy (b. 1396)
1521 – Tamás Bakócz, Hungarian cardinal (b. 1442)

1601–1900
1614 – Henry Howard, 1st Earl of Northampton, English courtier and politician, Lord Warden of the Cinque Ports (b. 1540)
1724 – Henry Sacheverell, English minister and politician (b. 1674)
1768 – James Short, Scottish mathematician and optician (b. 1710)
1772 – Louis-Claude Daquin, French organist and composer (b. 1694)
1844 – Thomas Campbell, Scottish poet and academic (b. 1777)
1849 – James K. Polk, American lawyer and politician, 11th President of the United States (b. 1795)
1858 – Ary Scheffer, Dutch-French painter and academic (b. 1795)
1881 – Franjo Krežma, Croatian violinist and composer (b. 1862)
1888 – Frederick III, German Emperor (b. 1831)
1889 – Mihai Eminescu, Romanian journalist, author, and poet (b. 1850)
1890 – Unryū Kyūkichi, Japanese sumo wrestler, the 10th Yokozuna (b. 1822)

1901–present
1917 – Kristian Birkeland, Norwegian physicist and academic (b. 1867)
1934 – Alfred Bruneau, French cellist and composer (b. 1857)
1938 – Ernst Ludwig Kirchner, German painter and illustrator (b. 1880)
1941 – Otfrid Foerster, German neurologist and physician (b. 1873)
  1941   – Evelyn Underhill, English mystic and author (b. 1875)
1945 – Count Albert von Mensdorff-Pouilly-Dietrichstein, Austrian diplomat
1961 – Giulio Cabianca, Italian racing driver (b. 1923)
  1961   – Peyami Safa, Turkish journalist and author (b. 1899)
1962 – Alfred Cortot, Swiss pianist and conductor (b. 1877)
1967 – Tatu Kolehmainen, Finnish runner (b. 1885)
1968 – Sam Crawford, American baseball player, coach, and umpire (b. 1880)
  1968   – Wes Montgomery, American guitarist and songwriter (b. 1925)
1971 – Wendell Meredith Stanley, American biochemist and virologist, Nobel Prize laureate (b. 1904)
1976 – Jimmy Dykes, American baseball player, coach, and manager (b. 1896)
1984 – Meredith Willson, American playwright, composer, and conductor (b. 1902)
1985 – Andy Stanfield, American sprinter (b. 1927)
1989 – Maurice Bellemare, Canadian lawyer and politician (b. 1912)
  1989   – Ray McAnally, Irish actor (b. 1926)
1991 – Happy Chandler, American businessman and politician, 49th Governor of Kentucky (b. 1898)
  1991   – Arthur Lewis, Saint Lucian economist and academic, Nobel Prize laureate (b. 1915)
1992 – Chuck Menville, American animator, producer, and screenwriter (b. 1940)
  1992   – Brett Whiteley, Australian painter (b. 1939)
1993 – John Connally, American commander, lawyer, and politician, 61st United States Secretary of the Treasury (b. 1917)
  1993   – James Hunt, English racing driver and sportscaster (b. 1947)
1994 – Manos Hatzidakis, Greek composer and theorist (b. 1925)
1995 – John Vincent Atanasoff, American physicist and inventor, invented the Atanasoff–Berry computer (b. 1903)
1996 – Ella Fitzgerald, American singer and actress (b. 1917)
  1996   – Sir Fitzroy Maclean, 1st Baronet, Scottish general and politician (b. 1911)
  1996   – Dick Murdoch, American wrestler (b. 1946)
1999 – Omer Côté, Canadian lawyer and politician (b. 1906)
2000 – Jules Roy, French author, poet, and playwright (b. 1907)
2001 – Henri Alekan, French cinematographer (b. 1909)
2002 – Choi Hong Hi, South Korean general and martial artist, founded Taekwondo (b. 1918)
2003 – Hume Cronyn, Canadian-American actor (b. 1911)
2004 – Ahmet Piriştina, Turkish politician and mayor of İzmir (b. 1952)
2005 – Suzanne Flon, French actress (b. 1918)
2006 – Raymond Devos, Belgian-French comedian and clown (b. 1922)
  2006   – Herb Pearson, New Zealand cricketer (b. 1910)
2008 – Ray Getliffe, Canadian ice hockey player (b. 1914)
2011 – Bill Haast, American herpetologist and academic (b. 1910)
2012 – Phillip D. Cagan, American economist and author (b. 1927)
  2012   – Barry MacKay, American tennis player and sportscaster (b. 1935)
  2012   – Israel Nogueda Otero, Mexican economist and politician, 10th Governor of Guerrero (b. 1935)
  2012   – Jerry Tubbs, American football player and coach (b. 1935)
2013 – Heinz Flohe, German footballer and manager (b. 1948)
  2013   – José Froilán González, Argentinian racing driver (b. 1922)
  2013   – Dennis O'Rourke, Australian director and producer (b. 1945)
  2013   – Kenneth G. Wilson, American physicist and academic, Nobel Prize laureate (b. 1936)
2014 – Jacques Bergerac, French actor and businessman (b. 1927)
  2014   – Casey Kasem, American radio host, producer, and voice actor, co-created American Top 40 (b. 1932)
  2014   – Daniel Keyes, American short story writer and novelist (b. 1927)
  2014   – Moise Safra, Brazilian businessman and philanthropist, co-founded Banco Safra (b. 1934)
2015 – Kirk Kerkorian, American businessman, founded the Tracinda Corporation (b. 1917)
2016 – Lois Duncan, American author (b. 1934)
2018 – Matt "Guitar" Murphy, American Blues guitarist (b. 1929)
2019 – Franco Zeffirelli, Italian film director (b. 1923)

Holidays and observances
Arbor Day (Costa Rica)
Christian feast day:
Abraham of Clermont (or of St Cyriacus)
Alice (or Adelaide) of Schaerbeek
Augustine of Hippo (Eastern Orthodox Church)
Blessed Albertina Berkenbrock
Blessed Clement Vismara
Edburga of Winchester
Evelyn Underhill (Church of England and The Episcopal Church)
Germaine Cousin
Landelin (of Crespin or of Lobbes)
Trillo
Vitus (Guy), Modestus and Crescentia
June 15 (Eastern Orthodox liturgics)
Day of Valdemar and Reunion Day (Flag Day) (Denmark)
Engineer's Day (Italy)
Global Wind Day (international)
National Beer Day (United Kingdom)
National Salvation Day (Azerbaijan)

References

External links

 
 
 

Days of the year
June